Płociczno  is a village in the administrative district of Gmina Kaliska, within Starogard County, Pomeranian Voivodeship, in northern Poland.

The village has a population of 58.

For details of the history of the region, see History of Pomerania.

References

Villages in Starogard County